The YouTube Streamy Awards, also known as the Streamy Awards or Streamys, are presented annually by Dick Clark Productions and Tubefilter to recognize excellence in online video, including directing, acting, producing, and writing. The formal ceremony at which the awards are presented takes place in Los Angeles, California. They were the first ever awards show dedicated entirely to web series.

History

The Streamy Awards are created by Executive Producers Drew Baldwin, Brady Brim-DeForest and Marc Hustvedt of Tubefilter and Joshua Cohen and Jamison Tilsner of Tilzy.tv.

The winners of awards in over 30 categories, including the Audience Choice and Visionary Award, were announced for the first time on March 28, 2009 at the 1st Annual Streamy Awards. Winners of the 1st Streamy Awards included individual recipients (Best Male and Female Actor), and web series. Each year, certain awards are presented before the main ceremony at the Streamys Craft Awards.

The 2nd Annual Streamy Awards were hosted by actor/comedian Paul Scheer and streamed live online from  the Orpheum Theatre (Los Angeles, California) on April 11, 2010. The production experienced technical problems as well as interruptions due to people streaking the stage and interrupting the presenters. This show incorporated an online live internet streaming broadcast. Due to poor reception and execution of the show, the International Academy of Web Television (IAWTV) halted its partnership with Tubefilter and co-production of the award ceremony and formed their own Web TV awards presentation.

In 2011, Tubefilter entered a partnership with established entertainment industry awards show producer Dick Clark Productions (producers of the American Music Awards, among others) to co-produce the 3rd Streamy Awards which were held in 2013 at the Hollywood Palladium in Los Angeles, and livestreamed across YouTube and multiple streaming networks simultaneously.

The 5th Streamy Awards were broadcast live on VH1 on September 17, 2015, and hosted by Grace Helbig and Tyler Oakley.

The 6th Streamy Awards were hosted by King Bach and was broadcast live on YouTube on October 4, 2016 from The Beverly Hilton Hotel.

The 7th Streamy Awards were hosted by Jon Cozart and was broadcast live on Twitter on September 26, 2017 from the Beverly Hilton Hotel.

The 8th Streamy Awards were hosted by The Try Guys and was broadcast live on YouTube on October 22, 2018 from the Beverly Hilton Hotel.

The 9th Streamy Awards was broadcast live on YouTube on December 13, 2019 from the Beverly Hilton Hotel. It was the first Streamy Award ceremony to run without a host.

In 2020, YouTube acquired the naming rights to the Streamy Awards.

The 10th Streamy Awards were broadcast on YouTube on December 12, 2020, and were hosted by drag queens Trixie Mattel and Katya Zamolodchikova. To adhere to social distancing restrictions, the duo presented the awards on a party bus being driven around Los Angeles.

The 11th Streamy Awards were broadcast on YouTube on December 11, 2021. They were hosted by American YouTuber Larray, alongside Issa Twaimz, once again being driven in a party bus around Los Angeles.

The 12th Streamy Awards were held on December 4, 2022 at The Beverly Hilton in Los Angeles and were hosted by the Youtuber Airrack (known in real life as Eric Decker), and also featured a performance by Yung Gravy. Mr. Beast won Creator of the year for the third year in a row.

Award categories
The current award categories for the Streamy Awards are separated into the main Streamy Awards and the Streamys Brand Awards. The current categories are:

Overall Awards
 Creator of the Year
 Show of the Year
 Streamer of the Year
 International
 Short Form

Individual Awards
 Breakout Creator
 Breakout Streamer
 Collaboration
 Creator for Social Good 
 Creator Product
 Crossover
 First Person
 Just Chatting
 Variety Streamer
 VTuber

Craft Awards
 Cinematography
 Editing
 Visual and Special Effects
 Writing

Subject Awards
 Animated
 Beauty
 Comedy
 Commentary
 Competitive Gamer
 Dance
 Fashion and Style
 Food
 Gamer
 Health and Wellness
 Kids and Family
 Learning and Education
 Lifestyle
 News
 Science and Engineering
 Sports
 Technology

Show Awards
 Podcast
 Scripted Series
 Unscripted Series

Brand Awards
 Brand of the Year
 Agency of the Year
 Brand Engagement
 Branded Series
 Branded Video
 Influencer Campaign
 Social Impact Campaign

List of shows

See also

 Shorty Awards
 Emmy Awards
 Webby Awards
 List of web awards

References

External links

Streamy Awards

 
American television-related lists
Awards established in 2009
American television awards
Blog awards
2009 establishments in the United States